Ye Yint Aung (born 26 February 1998) is a footballer from Burma, and a defender for the Myanmar U-19 football team and Yadanarbon FC. He was born in Indaw Township, Sagaing Division. He played football since he was 13. He also the Captain of Myanmar U-20 National Football Team played in 2017 World Cup U-20 Qualification. 17 October 2015, Yadanarbon FC signed Ye Yint Aung from Myanmar Football Academy (Mandalay) about 8,000,000 MMK.

References

External links
Myanmar Football 12th Players
Yadanarbon FC

1998 births
Living people
People from Sagaing Region
Burmese footballers
Myanmar international footballers
Association football fullbacks
Yadanarbon F.C. players
Footballers at the 2018 Asian Games
Asian Games competitors for Myanmar
Competitors at the 2019 Southeast Asian Games
Southeast Asian Games medalists in football
Southeast Asian Games bronze medalists for Myanmar